is a 1994 Japanese erotic film directed by Takahisa Zeze and starring Takeshi Itō, Saki Kurihara and Shirō Shimomoto.

Cast
Takeshi Itō
Saki Kurihara
Shirō Shimomoto
Hotaru Hazuki

Reception
It was selected for the main programme of the 1996 International Film Festival Rotterdam, where it had its international premiere. It was chosen as the 9th best film at 7th Pink Grand Prix and as the 10th best film at the 4th Japanese Professional Movie Awards.

References

External links

1990s erotic films
Films directed by Takahisa Zeze
Pink films
Shintōhō Eiga films
1990s Japanese films